Plater is a surname, and may refer to:
People
 Felix Plater (1536–1614), Swiss physician
 George Plater (1735–1792), American lawyer and politician
 Thomas Plater (1769–1830), American lawyer and politician
 Emilia Plater (1806–1831), Polish–Lithuanian noble and revolutionary
 Władysław Plater (1808–1889), Polish–Lithuanian count
 Jurgis Pliateris (1810–1836), Polish–Lithuanian noble and bibliographer
 Cecylia Plater-Zyberk (1853–1920), Polish social activist and educationalist
 Kazimierz Plater (1915–2004), Polish chess master
 Alan Plater (1935–2010), English playwright and screenwriter
 Bobby Plater (1914–1982), American jazz alto saxophonist
 Elizabeth Plater-Zyberk (1950–), American architect
 Steve Plater (1968–), English motorcycle racer
 Philip Plater (1866-1943), British sports shooter
 Matthew Plater (1995-), English cricketer 

Other
 Plater College, established in 1922 in Headington, Oxford
 Duany Plater Zyberk & Company, American architecture firm 
 Plater coat of arms

See also
 Platers (disambiguation)
 Platter (disambiguation)

Surnames

lv:Plātere (nozīmju atdalīšana)